Courage to Change may refer to:

Courage to Change (political action committee), American political organization
"Courage to Change" (song), 2020 Sia song